El Makina  (English: The Machine) (Arabic: الماكينة) is the second studio album by Jordanian rock band JadaL. It was released on December 29, 2012. This album  contains 10 tracks talks about social and personal issues matters to youth in the Middle East. Composed and written by Mahmoud Radaideh.

Track listing 

JadaL albums
2012 albums